Qarah Baba (also Romanized as Qarah Bābā and Qareh Bābā) is a village in Karaftu Rural District, in the Central District of Takab County, West Azerbaijan Province, Iran. At the 2006 census, its population was 32, in 6 families.

References 

Populated places in Takab County